Frederick Herbert Dauncey (1 December 1871 – 30 October 1955) was a Welsh international rugby union wing who played club rugby for Newport and was capped three times for Wales. Dauncey was an all-round sportsman, and also represented Wales in tennis and Newport in field hockey. He was educated at King Henry VIII Grammar School in Abergavenny and was a lifelong member of the schools Old Boys society.

Rugby career
Dauncey came to note as a Newport player, joining the club as a player in 1888. Dauncey made 178 appearances for Newport, scoring 94 tries, 9 conversions and a single dropped goal. Dauncey played at threequarters with two important Welsh international rugby players, Tom Pearson and Arthur 'Monkey' Gould, with whom, historian G. M. Trevelyan believed had an instinct to know where each were on the rugby pitch.

In 1896 Dauncey was awarded his first international cap, when he was selected to face England in the opening game of the Home Nations Championship. Brought into the team as a replacement for Newport team-mate Tom Pearson, Dauncey was positioned on the wing opposite another new cap, Cliff Bowen. Wales lost 25-0 to England. The Welsh selectors reacted by making multiple changes to the Welsh pack, but apart from replacing Owen Badger for Gwyn Nicholls, the threequarters were left alone, giving Dauncey a second cap in the second match of the tournament, home to Scotland. Played at the Cardiff Arms Park, two second half tries gave Wales victory over Scotland. Dauncey played his last international game, the last Welsh game of the 1895/96 season, away to Ireland, and Wales lost 4-8. The next season Dauncey was replaced by the return of Tom Pearson.

International matches played
Wales
  1896
  1896
  1896

Tennis career
Dauncey played tennis at a national level, representing the Welsh team in minor tournaments. In 1906 he partnered Wimbledon champion May Sutton in a mixed doubles match at the Welsh Tennis Championship, which although they were beaten in the second round, Sutton went on to win the ladies championship.

Hockey career
Dauncey, like fellow Wales rugby player Theo Harding, played field hockey. Dauncey followed Harding as captain of the Newport Hockey Club's men's team during the 1902 season.

Bibliography

References

1871 births
1955 deaths
19th-century Welsh people
Newport RFC players
Sportspeople from Pontypool
Rugby union wings
Wales international rugby union players
Welsh rugby union players
Welsh male tennis players
Welsh male field hockey players
Rugby union players from Pontypool
British male tennis players